The 2018 ABA League Playoffs is the play-off tournament that decides the winner of the 2017–18 ABA League First Division season. The playoffs started on March 18, 2018 and ended on April 14, 2018. The winner of the play-offs qualifies for the 2018–19 EuroLeague.

Qualified teams

Bracket

Semifinals

|}

1st leg

2nd leg

3rd leg

Finals

|}

1st leg

2nd leg

3rd leg

4th leg

See also 
 2018 ABA League Second Division Final Four
 2017 ABA League Playoffs
 2017–18 KK Crvena zvezda season

References

External links 
 Official website
 ABA League at Eurobasket.com

2017–18 in Serbian basketball
2017–18 in Croatian basketball
2017–18 in Montenegrin basketball